Pink is a 2016 Indian Hindi-language Legal thriller film directed by Aniruddha Roy Chowdhury and written by Shoojit Sircar, Ritesh Shah and Aniruddha Roy Chowdhury. Pink features an ensemble cast, which includes Taapsee Pannu, Kirti Kulhari, Andrea Tariang, Amitabh Bachchan, Angad Bedi, Tushar Pandey, Piyush Mishra, and Dhritiman Chatterjee.

Pink was released in worldwide cinemas on 16 September 2016. The film received widespread critical acclaim for the cast performances, execution, story, screenplay and direction. Pink emerged as a surprising commercial success earning over  globally. The film completed a 50-day run theatrically.

At the 64th National Film Awards, Pink won the category of Best Film on Other Social Issues. Pink received 5 nominations at the 62nd Filmfare Awards, including Best Film, Best Actor (Bachchan) and Best Supporting Actress (Kulhari), and won Best Dialogue (Ritesh Shah).

The film is remade in Tamil as Nerkonda Paarvai (2019) and in Telugu as Vakeel Saab (2021).

Plot 
Three young women — Minal, Falak and Andrea  — meet three affluent men, Raunak, Vishwajyoti, and Rajveer Singh, and they have some drinks together. Suddenly, Raunak, Vishwajyoti, and Rajveer rush to the nearest hospital because Rajveer is bleeding from a heavy injury to his head. At the same time Minal, Falak and Andrea return to their apartment in a taxi. They look disoriented, and it is implied that they have something to do with the incident.

The three women are independent and live together in New Delhi. They try to move on from what happened that night. During Minal's morning runs, she is observed by an old man in her neighbourhood, Deepak, who senses there is something wrong. Threats arise from Rajveer's friend Ankit, who pushes for revenge for the injury Minal caused Rajveer. The threats result in Falak losing her job. They are discouraged from filing a complaint, stating it would make their daily lives more miserable. In reality, the local police are aware that the men are "well-connected" and backed by Rajveer's uncle Ranjit, an influential politician. Minal goes to a higher-standing police officer and files a complaint.

The next day, she is kidnapped by Rajveer's friends. Deepak witnesses the incident but is unable to help. Minal is threatened, blackmailed, and molested in the moving car and dropped back home, leaving her shaken. A few days later, she is arrested based on a complaint from Rajveer labeling the women as prostitutes and charging Minal with attempted murder. At this point, Deepak becomes frustrated with the events and, after receiving advice from him, Andrea and Falak discover that he is actually a reputable lawyer in retirement. He helps Falak and Andrea with the bail procedures and decides to represent Minal in court.

In the courtroom, Rajveer's lawyer, Prashant Mehra, presents the following version of events: Rajveer and his friends meet Minal and her friends at a rock concert. They invite the women for dinner at a resort, where they have drinks. The women provoke the men, become intimate, and thereafter demand money, all signs indicating that they are prostitutes. Rajveer refuses to pay and an enraged Minal hits him on the head with a bottle and flees. Prashant's argument focuses on the poor moral character of the women. He attacks the fact that Minal has family in Delhi but chooses to live alone.

Minal and her friends' statement is this: The men tried to sexually assault them. Rajveer tried to rape Minal, and she attacked him with the bottle in self-defense. Deepak's argument focuses on the issue of consent and a woman's right to say no. A series of chilling courtroom arguments ensues in the following days. Toward the end of the trial, Rajveer becomes enraged and, provoked by Deepak, reveals the truth, stating that the women “got what they deserved”.

Deepak criticizes the regressed views of the society where women are stereotyped as prostitutes if they come home late, move out, want to be independent, drink and so on, but none of these apply to men. He closes with the fact that his client said “NO”. No means no, and does not require further explanation. The women are acquitted while Rajveer, Ankit, and Raunak are charged, with their sentences pending. Vishwajyoti is let off with a warning. The end credits scene reveal what actually happened: the men systematically isolated the women and Rajveer tried to force himself on Minal, who then attacked him with a bottle to his head in self defense.

Cast 

 Amitabh Bachchan as Deepak Sehgal
 Taapsee Pannu as Minal Arora
 Kirti Kulhari as Falak Ali
 Andrea Tariang as Andrea Tariang
 Angad Bedi as Rajveer Singh
 Dhritiman Chatterjee as Judge Satyajit Dutt
 Piyush Mishra as Prashant Mehra
 Vijay Varma as Ankit Malhotra
 Tushar Pandey as Vishwa a.k.a. Vishwajyoti Ghosh
 Dibang as JCP Amod
 Mamta Shankar as Sara Sehgal (Deepak's wife)
 Vinod Nagpal as Kasturi Lal (Landlord)
 Arjun Chakrabarty as Ritwik
 Raashul Tandon as Raunak Anand aka Dumpy

Production 
In early March 2016 Amitabh Bachchan revealed that he was shooting a film in Delhi. It was rumoured that the film was titled "Eve". On 13 March Bachchan denied the rumours and announced through Twitter that the film is titled Pink.

Director-producer Shoojit Sircar informed that Amitabh Bachchan accepted the role and Taapsee Pannu was their first choice. Andrea Tariang was also selected to play the role of one of the girls in the film. Tushar Pandey, Raashul Tandon and Arjun Chakraborty are making their debut with this film.

Filming 
The principal photography of the film began in New Delhi on International Women's Day, 2016. The looks of Amitabh Bachchan in the movie was created by Shoojit Sircar however the idea of wearing the mask was suggested by Amitabh Bachchan since Delhi is very polluted.

During the shoot, Amitabh Bachchan wandered the streets of New Delhi while wearing a costume in which the public could not recognise him. Amitabh Bachchan finished filming his scenes in April 2016.

Taapsee often broke down on the shooting sets as she felt her character was very strong and challenging. She suffered from viral infection during the court scenes and wanted to dub later, however Shoojit felt that her illness would add more authenticity to the scenes. Despite the hardships Taapsee enjoyed filming the scenes.

The original climax of Rajvir and his friends winning the case was modified so as not to hurt the sentiments of the audience.

A special screening of the film was held for Amitabh Bachchan's co stars and the leading ladies of Bollywood. However Amitabh Bachchan could not attend the screening due to health issues. Taapsee also arranged a special screening of the film for the Telugu film industry at Hyderabad.

Bishan Singh Bedi, father of Angad Bedi, arranged a special screening of the film in Delhi which was attended by cricketers like Kapil Dev, Virender Sehwag and Yuvraj Singh.

Marketing 
Shoojit Sircar and Amitabh Bachchan questioned their fans on Twitter as to what they think the film title "Pink" is all about. Times of India had opened a contest in which 5 lucky winners got a chance to meet Amitabh Bachchan and other 10 winners got free movie tickets of the movie -Pink. The winners were announced on 15-September-2016.

The world television premier was held on 23 – October 2016 on Star Gold and to commemorate the same, Amitabh Bachchan's house Jalsa, Carter Road Promenade and SNDT Women's University were illuminated in pink colour.

The title of the film has no relationship as being the favourite colour of girls but rather conveys that women should have the freedom to speak and walk freely at night.

Soundtrack

Release 
The film was specially screened for the Rajasthan Police so as to train them to be sensitive and sensible about women's rights and dignity. The film was also specially screened at Rashtrapati Bhavan and invited for a screening at the United Nations headquarters in New York City.

Critical reception 

Meena Iye of The Times of India and Shubha Shetty Saha of Indiatimes gave the film 4.5 stars. Mayank Shekhar from Mid-Day gave the film 4/5 stars, saying, "The film, up until the closing credits, does not even visually describe the said incident. It grips you still with a gently piercing background score, moments of silence and dialogue, building up the tension, while the audience wonders what really could have happened one unfortunate night when three girls found themselves in a Surajkund resort with three guys."

Anna M.M. Vetticad of Firstpost called Pink a powerful film. Filmfare, India Today, Mumbai Mirror, Hindustan Times, The Statesman, and DNA have given 4/5 stars, highly appreciating the superlative performances, especially of Amitabh Bachchan. Critics like Anusha Iyengar and Mayank Shekhar called it movie of the year. Namrata Joshi of The Hindu also praised the film. Shubhra Gupta of Indian Express gave the film 3.5 stars.

Rajeev Masand from News18 rated the movie as 4.5/5 mentioning that "I left the cinema, my mouth dry at the end of Pink. This isn't just an important film, but also excellently made. It's a giant leap for Hindi cinema, and easily the best film this year".

Box office 
Pink grossed approximately 4.32 crore on first day in India. The first weekend collection was 21.51 crore.

At the end of 7 days the domestic box office collection was 35.91 crore. Pink grossed 50 crore in first 10 days in India.

Accolades

Remakes

Bibliography

References

External links 
 
 
 

2016 films
2010s Hindi-language films
2010s female buddy films
2016 thriller drama films
Films scored by Anupam Roy
Indian courtroom films
Indian female buddy films
Indian feminist films
Films about rape in India
Films about social issues in India
Films about women in India
Films scored by Shantanu Moitra
Films set in Delhi
Films shot in Delhi
Indian thriller drama films
Indian legal films
Social realism in film
Films with screenplays by Ritesh Shah
Best Film on Other Social Issues National Film Award winners
Hindi films remade in other languages
2016 drama films
Films directed by Aniruddha Roy Chowdhury